"So Sorry, I Said" is a song by American singer and actress Liza Minnelli, released as the third single from her ninth album, Results (1989). The song was released on Epic Records on 13 November 1989. It stalled in the charts just outside the top 60 at number 62. This may have been in part because the single offered fans nothing new—both tracks on the 7" were lifted straight from the album, and the bonus material on the 12" was already released on the American 12"  "Losing My Mind" single. The song was also performed by Pet Shop Boys (the song's writers) on their 1991 Performance tour. Their original demo recording of "So Sorry, I Said", with lead vocals by Neil Tennant, was later included on the expanded re-issue of their 1988 album Introspective in 2001.

Critical reception
American singer-songwriter Taylor Dayne reviewed the song for Number One, saying, "Liza Minnelli is a bit too theatrical for my liking but you can't deny that the woman has a brilliant voice and she's a real star. I mean a legend you know? I'm not sold on this tune but it's quite pleasant." The magazine's Edwin J. Bernard praised it as "brilliant". Chris Heath from Smash Hits named it "the best thing on her LP", declaring the song as "sad, beautiful and rather fabulous."

Track listing
 7", Epic / ZEE 3 (UK)
 "So Sorry, I Said" – 3:14
 "I Can't Say Goodnight" – 4:52

* also available on MC (ZEE M3)

 12", Epic / ZEE T3 (UK)
 "So Sorry, I Said" – 3:14
 "I Can't Say Goodnight" – 4:52
 "Losing My Mind" (ultimix) – 6:37
 "Losing My Mind" (ultimix dub) – 5:07

* also available on MC (ZEE MT3 – "The 12" cassette")
* also available on CD (ZEE C3)
* also available on CD (CPZEE 3 – Limited edition: Blue Xmas card w/CD)

Charts

References

1990 singles
Pet Shop Boys songs
Liza Minnelli songs
Songs written by Neil Tennant
Songs written by Chris Lowe
Song recordings produced by Julian Mendelsohn
1989 songs
Epic Records singles